KRYD (104.9 FM, "97.7 & 104.9 Jack FM") is a radio station broadcasting an adult hits music format in the Grand Junction, Colorado market. Licensed to Norwood, Colorado, United States.  The station is currently owned by Rocky III Investments. DBA: Sunshine Broadcasting, Inc  KRYD is also simulcasted on 97.7 KNOZ Orchard Mesa, Colorado, formerly an all-news radio station.

References

External links

RYD